Pavel Voroshnin (born March 24, 1984) is a Russian professional ice hockey player. He was selected by Buffalo Sabres in the 6th round (172nd overall) of the 2003 NHL Entry Draft. He is currently playing with Buran Voronezh of the Russian Higher Hockey League.

Voroshnin played in the Kontinental Hockey League with Khimik Voskresensk during the 2008-09 season.

Career statistics

References

External links

1984 births
Living people
Buffalo Sabres draft picks
Khimik Voskresensk (KHL) players
Russian ice hockey defencemen